The European Mountain Bike Championships (EMBCs) are an annual mountain bike racing championship in Europe. They have been held since 1989, and on an annual basis since 1991. There have been 28 editions as of 2017.

Editions

Medals

Winners

Cross-country

Men
Elite

Under-23

Juniors

Women
Elite

In 2012 the event was held in Russia.

Under-23

Juniors

Cross-country eliminator

Men 
Elite

Women 
Elite

Cross-country Short Circuit (XCC)

Men 
Elite

Juniors

Women 
Elite

Juniors

Downhill

Men 
Elite

Juniors

Women
Elite

Juniors

Marathon

Men 
Elite

Under-23

Women

Four-cross

Men

Women

Dual slalom

Men

Women

Mixed relay

Trials

Men
Elite 20"

Elite 26"

Juniors 20"

Juniors 26"

Women

Notes

 
Mountain biking events
European cycling championships